This is a list of the chicken breeds considered in Japan to be wholly or partly of Japanese origin. Some may have complex or obscure histories, so inclusion here does not necessarily imply that a breed is predominantly or exclusively Japanese.

References

 
Chicken